Wilhelm Kobelt (20 February 1840 – 26 March 1916) was a German zoologist born in Alsfeld, Grand Duchy of Hesse. He specialized in the field of malacology.

Kobelt is remembered for his work as curator of the Senckenberg Museum in Frankfurt am Main.

Several species of mollusk contain his name, including Fusinus kobelti (Kobelt's spindle), Cymatium kobelti and Hyalinia kobelti. Kobeltia, a subgenus of Arion slugs, is named in honor of him.

Selected publications 
 Archiv für Molluskenkunde, 1868 - Archive of malacology.
 Jahrbücher der Deutschen Malakozoologischen Gesellschaft, 1874 - Yearbook of the German Malaco-zoology Society. 
 Illustrirtes conchylienbuch, 1876 - Illustrated book of conchology.
 Reiseerinnerungen aus Algerien und Tunis, 1885 - Travel memoirs of Algeria and Tunis.
 Prodromus faunae molluscorum testaceorum maria europaea inhabitantium, 1886.
 Studien zur Zoogeographie, 1897 - Zoogeographical studies.
 Cyclophoridae, 1902 - Cyclophoridae.
 Die Verbreitung der Tierwelt : gemässigte Zone, 1902 - Distribution of wildlife; temperate zone.
  Kobelt W. (1909). "Die Gattung Paludina Lam. (Vivipara Montfort) (Neue Folge). In Abbildungen nach der Natur mit Beschreibungen". Systematisches Conchylien-Cabinet von Martini und Chemnitz, Nürnberg, 1(21a): pp. 97-430, plates 15-77.

References

External links 

 Senckenberg Museum Deutschen Malakozoologischen Gesellschaft (DMG)  
 

1840 births
1916 deaths
People from Alsfeld
People from the Grand Duchy of Hesse
German malacologists
German curators